The Venezuela national baseball team (Spanish: Selección de béisbol de Venezuela) commonly known as the Team Arepa is the national team of Venezuela. It is currently ranked sixth in the world by the World Baseball Softball Confederation, behind the Mexico and ahead of the Netherlands. The team will compete against Israel, Puerto Rico, the Dominican Republic, and Nicaragua in the 2023 World Baseball Classic in March 2023 in Miami, Florida.

Current roster

Results and fixtures
The following is a list of professional baseball match results currently active in the latest version of the WBSC World Rankings, as well as any future matches that have been scheduled.

Legend

2019

2022

2023

Tournament record

World Baseball Classic

In June 2005, Major League Baseball announced the formation of the World Baseball Classic, a sixteen nation international competition to be held in March 2006 for the first time. The team Venezuela sent to the 2006 and 2009 World Baseball Classic included Venezuelan players from Major League Baseball. A player is eligible to participate on a WBC national team if:
The player is a citizen of the nation the team represents.
The player is qualified for citizenship or to hold a passport under the laws of a nation represented by a team, but has not been granted citizenship or been issued a passport, then the player may be made eligible by WBCI upon petition by the player or team.
The player is a permanent legal resident of the nation or territory the team represents.
The player was born in the nation or territory the team represents.
The player has one parent who is, or if deceased was, a citizen of the nation the team represents.
The player has one parent who was born in the nation or territory the team represents.

2009: Bronze medal
Venezuela competed in the 2009 World Baseball Classic, playing its opening games in Pool C, in Toronto, Ontario.  The Venezuelans secured advancement out of Pool C with a pair of resounding wins over Italy.  Along the way, Venezuela also lost a 15–6 slugfest against the United States, but won twice against the same team.

2013: First round exit
In the 2013 World Baseball Classic, Venezuela was eliminated by Puerto Rico, who went on to eliminate Italy, the United States and two-time defending champion Japan.  Their placing as the third team in Pool C after defeating newcomers Spain was sufficient to secure direct qualification to the 2017 World Baseball Classic.

2017: Misses the finals again

2023

The team will compete against Team Israel, Team Puerto Rico, Team Dominican Republic, and Team Nicaragua in the 2023 World Baseball Classic in March 11-15, 2023 in Miami, Florida.

Baseball World Cup

2009 IBAF World Cup
In 2009, Europe will host the IBAF World Cup. It will mark the first time in history the Baseball World Cup will not be hosted by a certain country, but rather a whole continent. The 2009 Baseball World Cup will take place from 9–27 September. Seven European countries will host and participant in the tournament of 22 teams. The event will be made up of five groups consisting of four teams each, for a total of 20 teams. Italy (Bollate, Bologna, Codogno, Florence, Macerata, Milan, Parma, Piacenza, Reggio Emilia, Rimini, San Marino, Turin, Trieste, Verona and Vicenza) and Netherlands (Rotterdam, Haarlem and Amsterdam) serve as hosts of the sixteen teams of the second round ( 14–20 September), and therefore receive first round byes. The groups are as follows:

Group A (hosted by the Czech Republic in Prague): Czech Republic, Australia, Chinese Taipei & Mexico
Group B (hosted by Spain in Barcelona): Spain, Cuba, Puerto Rico & South Africa
Group C (hosted by Sweden in Stockholm): Sweden, Canada, Korea & Netherlands Antilles
Group D (hosted by Russia in Moscow): Russia, France/Great Britain, Japan & Nicaragua
Group E (hosted by Germany in Regensburg): Germany, China, U.S.A. & Venezuela

Pan American Games

U-23 Baseball World Cup

Players
 2006 World Baseball Classic
 2009 World Baseball Classic
 2013 World Baseball Classic

Uniform

See also

 Players from Venezuela in MLB

References

External links